Donald J. Kouri (July 25  1938 – February 9 2021) is an American physicist currently the Cullen Distinguished Professor at University of Houston.  He completed his PhD from University of Wisconsin in 1965.

Research interest 
Donald J Kouri carries out research in the fundamental implications of the Heisenberg uncertainty principle and the resulting applications and also generalized coherent states. He has also pioneered the research in quantum theory of atomic collisions and molecular collisions.

He has taught and carried out research in Israel and Germany, and participated in international conferences throughout the world.

Awards 
 2010: National Science Foundation’s Special Creativity Award
 1978: Guggenheim Fellowship for Natural Sciences, US & Canada

Works 
 Kouri, Donald J (2015) Quantum Scattering Theory. World Scientific Publishing Company
 Kouri, Donald J and Shi, Zhouoer (2001) Lagrange Wavelets for Signal Processing. IEEE 
 Kouri, Donald J. (1991). Theoretical studies of molecular collisions. National Aeronautics and Space Administration

References

1938 births
Living people
University of Houston faculty
21st-century American physicists
American people of Lebanese descent
University of Wisconsin–Madison alumni